Tomato Head Records was an independent record label started by Chuck Phelps after his split with the ska punk band Skankin' Pickle and Dill Records.  The label most notably released the debut EP of Tsunami Bomb, The Invasion from Within! and the Luckie Strike EP, Future is Turning. The label is now in indefinite hiatus.

Former bands
The Adjustments
Blindspot
The Jamons
Link 80
Lesdystics
Luckie Strike
My New Life
Nicotine
The Peacocks
The Rayguns
Tsunami Bomb
The Wunder Years
Young Punch

See also
 List of record labels

Record labels established in 1996
American independent record labels
Punk record labels
Ska record labels